Leslie or Les Wood may refer to:

Leslie Wood (footballer) (born 1932), English goalkeeper
Leslie Wood (illustrator) (born 1920), English artist
Les Wood (politician), Australian member of the Queensland Legislative Assembly
Les Wood (trade unionist) (1920-2010), English trade union leader
Les Wood (footballer), New Zealand footballer

See also
Lesley Woods (1910–2003), actress